Urtė is a Lithuanian feminine given name. People bearing the name Urtė include:
Urtė Juodvalkytė (born 1986), Lithuanian road cyclist 
Urtė Kazakevičiūtė (born 1993), Lithuanian swimmer
Urtė Neniškytė (born 1983), Lithuanian neuroscientist

Lithuanian feminine given names